The 1967 Torneo Descentralizado was the 51st season of the highest division of Peruvian football. Although Alfonso Ugarte de Chiclín and Octavio Espinosa were relegated last season, they regained promotion to the first division through the 1967 Copa Perú which was played prior to the start of the first division. Juan Aurich of Chiclayo made its debut in the first division in this season.

The defending champion Universitario retained their title. Deportivo Municipal and Alfonso Ugarte de Chiclín were relegated.

Teams

League table

External links
Peru 1967 season at RSSSF

1967 in Peruvian football
Peru